Hellmuth is both a masculine German given name and a surname. Notable people with the name include:

Given name:
 Hellmuth Heye (1895–1970), German admiral and politician
 Hellmuth Hirth (1886–1938), German engineer who founded engine manufacturing companies
 Hellmuth Karasek (1934–2015), German journalist, literary critic, novelist and author
 Hellmuth Mäder (1908–1984), German general
 Hellmuth von Mücke (1881–1957), German Navy officer, pacifist writer
 Hellmuth Reymann (1892–1988), German Army officer
 Hellmuth Walter (1900–1980), German engineer who pioneered research into rocket engines and gas turbines
 Hellmuth Wolff (organ builder) (1937–2013), Canadian organ builder

Surname:
 Isaac Hellmuth (1819–1901), founder of Huron University College and the University of Western Ontario
 Otto Hellmuth (1896–1968), member of the Nazi party
 Phil Hellmuth (born 1964), American poker player

Companies
 Gert Hellmuth GmbH, designer and manufacturer of jewelry, founded by Gert Hellmuth in 1983, based in Pforzheim, Germany
 Hellmuth Walter Kommanditgesellschaft, defunct company

Institutions 
 Hellmuth Ladies' College (1869–1899), London, Ontario

See also 
 Hellmuth, Obata and Kassabaum, an architecture-engineering firm
 Helmuth

German-language surnames
German masculine given names